Klemen "Klem" Mohorič (born May 25, 1975) is a retired Slovenian professional ice hockey goaltender. He spent the majority of his career with the HDD Olimpija Ljubljana of the Slovenian Ice Hockey Championship.

Playing career
Mohorič started his professional hockey career during the 1996–97 ECHL season. He signed with the Louisville RiverFrogs on October 26, 1996. In ten games with the Riverfrogs, he went 0-6-2 with a 4.74 GAA. He would later be moved to the Johnstown Chiefs that season. Mohorič would make 15 appearances with the Chiefs, going 5-5-1.

Mohorič would return home to play for the Slovenian team Olimpija Ljubljana in 1997, who at the time played in the Slovenian Ice Hockey Championship. Olimpija would finish the season as Slovenian Champions during each of Mohorič's season until 2003. Mohorič would leave the team in 2003 to play for Merano, a Serie A team that played in the top tier of Italy's professional hockey league.

Mohorič returned to Ljubljana to play for HK Slavija Ljubljana, where he would spend one season before returning to Olimpija Ljubljana. After three seasons with Olimpija, Mohorič retired after the 2007–08 season.

Awards and accomplishments
1991-92 Slovenian Champion, HK Acroni Jesenice
1992-93 Slovenian Champion, HK Acroni Jesenice
1993-94 Slovenian Champion, HK Acroni Jesenice
1994-95 Slovenian Champion, HK Acroni Jesenice
1997-98 Slovenian Champion, Olimpija Ljubljana
1998-99 Slovenian Champion, Olimpija Ljubljana
1999-00 Slovenian Champion, Olimpija Ljubljana
2000-01 Slovenian Champion, Olimpija Ljubljana
2000-01 IIHF Men's World Ice Hockey Championships Gold Medal (Division 1, Group B), Team Slovenia
2001-02 Slovenian Champion, Olimpija Ljubljana
2002-03 Slovenian Champion, Olimpija Ljubljana
2006-07 Slovenian Champion, Olimpija Ljubljana

Personal
Mohorič is now a distribution agent for the hockey company Torspo in his hometown of Bled.

References

External links 

1975 births
HDD Olimpija Ljubljana players
HK Acroni Jesenice players
HK Slavija Ljubljana players
Johnstown Chiefs players
Living people
Louisville RiverFrogs players
People from Bled
Slovenian ice hockey goaltenders
HC Merano players
Penticton Panthers players
Merritt Centennials players
Langley Thunder players
Keramin Minsk players
Slovenian expatriate ice hockey people
Slovenian expatriate sportspeople in the United States
Slovenian expatriate sportspeople in Belarus
Slovenian expatriate sportspeople in Italy
Slovenian expatriate sportspeople in Canada
Expatriate ice hockey players in the United States
Expatriate ice hockey players in Canada
Expatriate ice hockey players in Italy
Expatriate ice hockey players in Belarus